Fowler Newsam Hall is a Grade II listed group of Victorian school buildings. Originally the Saint Ann's Junior Mixed School, they become dilapidated during the nineteen sixties. They were refurbished by Rackham Construction in 1978/9 and reopened on 1 July 1979. The charity set up in 1966 to raise funds for this purpose was closed in 2013.

Fowler Newsam, a wealthy business man who lived near the site, was the primary benefactor of both St Ann's Church opposite the hall on Avenue Road and the school itself.

Architecture

History
The school opened in 1858 as the Hermitage school for boys, girls, and infants. Following the establishment of a new boys' school and then an infants' school this building became a girls' school in 1871.

Current use
The hall is today used for a variety of community purposes including a school of dance and the Fowler Newsham Hall Counselling Project.

References

External links
Photos

Former school buildings in the United Kingdom